The Hong Kong Chess Federation (HKCF) is the governing body for chess in Hong Kong

Founded in 1960
HKCF joined FIDE in 1961 and is part of Zone 3.3
President as of September 2016 is Robin Lai.
President as of April 2015 is David Garceran Nieuwenburg. Before then Dr. Hong Ki Tsang had replaced Jackson Li in December 2014 after Jackson Li's Presidency of almost 2 decades.
Member of the International Correspondence Chess Federation, delegate: Henry Leung.
Member of the Asian Chess Federation

The HKCF organises social and competition chess in Hong Kong, and selects players to represent Hong Kong internationally, e.g. the Chess Olympiad, which takes place every second year. Hong Kong has participated at the Chess Olympiads since 1967. It also supports the development of junior players, with school championships organised as well as individual junior championships.

The Hong Kong team in the 1974 Students' Chess Olympiad consisted of five brothers aged 8 to 18.  In 1990 the Hong Kong Olympiad team consisted of four players from four countries.

The Asian Cities Chess Championship was launched by the Hong Kong Chess Federation in 1978 under the sponsorship of the Hongkong and Shanghai Bank. The first Asian Cities title went to Singapore.

References

External links
 Hong Kong Chess Federation official website 
 Hong Kong Chess Association (HKCA) Limited, a non-profit organisation with the main objective to promote and encourage the development of chess among students in Hong Kong. 
 Federations Ranking  (FIDE)

Further reading
 Chess for Friday 6 May 2000 by Kaarlo Schepel about the end of the chess column of the South China Morning Post
 Knights of the square table Kevin Kwong, Saturday, 9 March 1996

National members of the Asian Chess Federation
Chess in Hong Kong
Chess
1960 establishments in Hong Kong
Sports organizations established in 1960
Chess organizations
1960 in chess